The Litte is a river of Saxony, Germany. It is a left tributary of the Großschweidnitzer Wasser, which it joins in Großschweidnitz.

See also
List of rivers of Saxony

Rivers of Saxony
Rivers of Germany